Ali Sultaan Asani (born 1954 in Nairobi, Kenya) is a Kenyan-American academic. He is Murray A. Albertson Professor of Middle Eastern Studies and Professor of Indo-Muslim and Islamic Religion and Cultures at Harvard University. He has served as Director of Prince Alwaleed bin Talal Islamic Studies Program at Harvard University as well as the Chair of the Department of Near Eastern Languages and Civilizations.

Background
Asani was born and brought up in Kenya. He is of Sindhi heritage from present-day Pakistan; his ancestors belonged to the Ismaili Khoja community.

Academic career
After completing his high-school education in Kenya, he attended Harvard College, graduating in 1977 summa cum laude in the Comparative Study of Religion. He continued his graduate work at Harvard in the Department of Near Eastern Languages and Civilizations (NELC) specializing in Indo-Muslim Culture, and received his Ph.D. in 1984.He was then appointed assistant professor of Indo-Muslim Culture in the Department of Near Eastern Languages and Civilizations and the Department of Sanskrit and Indian Studies, teaching Urdu-Hindi, Sindhi, Gujarati, and Swahili as well as courses on various aspects of the Islamic tradition. He has since been given tenure and appointed Murray A. Albertson Professor of Middle Eastern Studies and Professor of Indo-Muslim and Islamic Religion and Cultures in the Committee on the Study of Religion and the Department of Near Eastern Languages and Civilizations.  He directs NELC's doctoral program in Indo-Muslim Culture.

A scholar of Islam in South Asia, Asani's research focuses on Shii and Sufi devotional traditions in the region. In addition, he is interested in popular and folk forms of Muslim devotional life, and Muslim communities in the West. He is the recipient of several awards including the Harvard Foundation Medal for his contributions to improving intercultural and inter-racial relations, the Petra C. Shattuck Prize for teaching, the Harvard Phi Beta Kappa Award for Excellence in Teaching, and the 2020 Harvard Foundation Faculty of the Year Award for his efforts at making Harvard College a more inclusive institution.

References

External links
 Ali S. Asani details from Harvard University
 Bio on thegreatlecturelibrary.com.

1954 births
Living people
American Islamic studies scholars
American Sindhologists
American people of Sindhi descent
Kenyan emigrants to the United States
Kenyan people of Sindhi descent
American Muslims
Harvard College alumni
Harvard University faculty
Muslim scholars of Islamic studies